The Florida Marlins' 1995 season was the third season for the Major League Baseball (MLB) franchise in the National League.  It would begin with the team attempting to improve on their season from 1994. Their manager was Rene Lachemann. They played home games at Joe Robbie Stadium. They finished with a record of 67–76, fourth in the National League East. The Marlins scored 673 runs and allowed 673 runs to finish with a run differential of zero.

Offseason
 December 6, 1994: Bret Barberie was traded by the Marlins to the Baltimore Orioles for Jay Powell.

Regular season

Season standings

Record vs. opponents

Notable transactions
 April 5, 1995: Mario Díaz was signed as a free agent with the Florida Marlins.
 April 7, 1995: Terry Pendleton was signed as a free agent by the Marlins.
 April 10, 1995: Andre Dawson was signed as a free agent by the Marlins.
 April 26, 1995: Aaron Small was traded by the Toronto Blue Jays to the Florida Marlins for a player to be named later. The Florida Marlins sent Ernie Delgado (minors) (September 19, 1995) to the Toronto Blue Jays to complete the trade.
 June 21, 1995: Doug Dascenzo was signed as a free agent with the Florida Marlins.
 July 30, 1995: Mark Davis was signed as a free agent by the Marlins.
August 7, 1995: Buddy Groom was traded by the Detroit Tigers to the Florida Marlins for a player to be named later. The Florida Marlins sent Mike Myers (August 9, 1995) to the Detroit Tigers to complete the trade.

Roster

Player stats

Batting

Starters by position 
Note: Pos = Position; G = Games played; AB = At bats; H = Hits; Avg. = Batting average; HR = Home runs; RBI = Runs batted in

Other batters 
Note: G = Games played; AB = At bats; H = Hits; Avg. = Batting average; HR = Home runs; RBI = Runs batted in

Pitching

Starting pitchers 
Note: G = Games pitched; IP = Innings pitched; W = Wins; L = Losses; ERA = Earned run average; SO = Strikeouts

Other pitchers 
Note: G = Games pitched; IP = Innings pitched; W = Wins; L = Losses; ERA = Earned run average; SO = Strikeouts

Relief pitchers 
Note: G = Games pitched; W = Wins; L = Losses; SV = Saves; ERA = Earned run average; SO = Strikeouts

Farm system

References

External links
1995 Florida Marlins at Baseball Reference
1995 Florida Marlins at Baseball Almanac

Miami Marlins seasons
Florida Marlins season
Miami Marl